Peter Lam Both (born in 1972) has been the Governor of Latjoor, South Sudan since 24 December 2015. Both is the first governor of the state, which was created by President Salva Kiir on 2 October 2015.

Career
Peter Lam Both was a high-ranking South Sudanese diplomat of the Sudan People's Liberation Movement (SPLM) and was appointed as Commissioner for National Relief and Rehabilitation Commission in the National Government of South Sudan on 7 June 2012 by President Salva Kiir. Both served in this position until 27 November 2013 when differences arose between him and the newly appointed Minister of Gender, Child and Social Welfare, Awut Deng Acuil who was also entrusted to head the defunct Ministry of Humanitarian Affairs and Disaster Management. The Commission which Peter headed is responsible for delivery of humanitarian and relief services to the people of South Sudan while the function of the Ministry for Humanitarian Affairs was for policy formulation and development. When Awut became Minister, she frustrated the work of the commission as she wanted to take over the functions of the Commission and that didn't sit well with Peter. As a result, Both wrote to the President of the Republic demanding that the Minister be asked to function within the confines of the constitutional mandate or Both be relieved so that the Commission does not die in his hands. Instead of correcting the situation, the President relieved him on 27 November 2013. Since his relief from office, the commission is no longer functioning as its work is usurped by the Minister and the Ministry. The new chairperson will either have to remain dormant or Both will also lose his job if Both challenges Awut because President Kiir is known for abandoning government interest in order to protect the interest of Awut.

Before the outbreak of South Sudan crisis on 15 December 2013, Peter warned the people of South Sudan that the Vice President was provoking a crisis in the country in a meeting they held with President Kiir on 1 May 2013 which Both reiterated on national SSTV. Both and a group of other Jikany leaders met with former Vice President Riek Machar on 4 May 2013 in which they warned him not to involve and politicize the community of Nuer and SPLA Nuer elements in an SPLM power struggle. On 6 May 2013, Peter and Riek Machar met in his office in which Riek wanted to find out from him what Both talked about on National SSTV on 1 May 2013. In front of his aides, Peter explained to Riek that Both was taking the country to brink of war by invoking ethnic Nuer sentiments to support his bid for chairmanship of the party rather than using SPLM political platform to convince voters to elect him. Peter was the first official to call on South Sudanese leaders to stop the crisis before it happened, but instead, Both was criticized by Dr. Riek's supports like Hon. Gatluak Riek Jaak and Hon. John Chuol Char saying that Peter was not being truthful and that Dr. Machar was not provoking any crisis in the country. Both was also criticized by Nuer Diaspora elements who are staunch supporters of Dr. Riek Machar. But, Peter was vindicated on 15 December 2013 when war broke out and members of the Nuer community became victims of the crisis because they are from Riek's ethnic group. Peter remained loyal to SPLM under the leadership of President Salva Kiir Mayardit as a symbol of unity and national integration.

Peter Lam served as State Minister of Information and Communications in Upper Nile State from June 2010-May 2012. Both was also appointed as SPLM Deputy Secretary for External Relations on August 28, 2009. Both was previously posted to Canada from May 2006- November 2008 as the first official Representative of the SPLM to Canada. Both was also acting as the Chief Representative for the newly formed Government of Southern Sudan. Both was charged by the SPLM leadership to organize SPLM Chapters in various cities of Canada and to rally the support of the Government of Canada for SPLM and Government of Southern Sudan.

Both helped form 14 SPLM Chapters across the country with membership of over 4000. Both managed to diplomatically seduce Canada to accept SPLM and work with the Government of Southern Sudan, which finally culminated in the establishment of the Liaison Office for the Government of Southern Sudan in Ottawa in 2008 in accordance with the provisions of the Comprehensive Peace Agreement(CPA) and the Interim Constitution of Southern Sudan. Canada is known internationally for refusing to work with rebels, a case signaled by their refusal to work with the former leader of SPLM Dr. John Garang de Mabior. Peter was one of the key leaders of Sudanese community in Canada who defeated Talisman Energy of Canada. 

Peter, a lecturer of Social Work at the University of Calgary, University of Lethbridge and Mount Royal College in Canada, joined SPLM in 1986 after Both fled from Sudan at the age of 14 due to civil war. Both lived in various refugee camps in Ethiopia, but managed to continue his education with the help of the United Nations High Commissioner for Refugees(UNHCR). Both graduated with B.A. in Political Science and International Relations (1996) in Addis Ababa University in  Ethiopia (the oldest university in the continent). Both also graduated with Bachelor of Social Work (2002) and Masters of International Social Work (2004) from the University of Calgary. Both is in his final stages of his Ph.D. dissertation in the Faculty of Social Work, University of Calgary.

In addition to his diplomatic work as SPLM/GOSS Representative to Canada, Peter has extensive diplomatic experience in his work with United Nations in Ethiopia (1996), India (2003)  and Jordan in 2005. Both has worked with various organizations in Canada including Calgary Catholic Immigration Society as Settlement Officer (1998–2000) and with the City of Calgary as Community Development Officer (2002–2005) and as a Social Planner with the City of Calgary (2005–present). Both led the first ever SPLM delegation from Canada in May 2008 to participate in the Second SPLM National Convention in Juba where Both played a key role in mobilizing the delegates to maintain the unity of SPLM by proposing to keep the current leadership as it is. The SPLM unity was at stake in the Convention, but the party rose to the challenge and opted to keep the status quo.

He submitted his resignation to the chairman of the SPLM on November 15, 2008 stating that Both was time pressed with his studies. But those who monitored the situation in Canada said that Peter was humiliated when the Liaison Office for the Government of Southern Sudan was appointed and left him and key SPLM leaders in Canada out of the office. Both did not know how to explain this action to the SPLM leaders in Canada who thought Both had a role in the appointments. At the same time, Both could not point fingers at the leaders in Juba who actually did the appointments due to the political sensitivity of the issue. The appointments made were seen by all southern Sudanese in Canada as tribally motivated, but what is puzzling is that Peter is known to detest tribalism and could not possibly be linked to those appointments. Resignation was an easy route for him to avoid being associated with those appointments. But Peter always denied those claims, saying that Both has completed the work Both was asked to do. Both always says, "I have accomplished what was hard to do; what has remained now is the day today management of the chapters and the nurturing of our bilateral diplomatic relations with Canada, which does not require rocket science."

His publications include: South Sudan: forgotten tragedy (2003), International Relations of Ethiopia (2004) and upcoming memoirs entitled Difficult Journey to be published by the University of Calgary Press. Both has also published peer-reviewed articles with Journal of Social Work and Journal of Educational Action Research in 2008.

References

External links
Second SPLM National Convention, Juba, South Sudan, 2008.
South Sudan: forgotten tragedy (2003). First Books Library, Bloomington, Indiana. United States.
International Relations of Ethiopia: the strategy of a developing state (2004). Author House. Bloomington, Indiana. United States.
Working with Diverse communities in East Calgary. Journal of Social Work. No. 8, Vol.4, 2008.
Recording Action Research in a classroom: singing with Chickadees. Journal of Educational Action Research. Issue No.3, Vol. 16.
SPLM Canada Condemns the violation of Sudan's CPA.
SPLM Representative to Canada talks about progress and challenges.
"SPLM Representative to Canada resigns"

1972 births
Living people
Second Sudanese Civil War
Sudanese diplomats
Sudan People's Liberation Movement politicians
People from Upper Nile (state)
Addis Ababa University alumni
University of Calgary alumni